Thomas & Friends is a children's television series about the engines and other characters working on the railways of the Island of Sodor, and is based on The Railway Series books written by the Reverend W. Awdry.

This article lists and details episodes from the fifteenth series of the show, which was first broadcast in March 2011, making it the third series to be broadcast in less than a month. This series was narrated by Michael Angelis for the UK audiences, while Michael Brandon narrated the episodes for the US audiences.

This was Christopher Skala's last series as executive producer.

Episodes

Voice cast

Rupert Degas joined the voice cast. Degas originally voiced Diesel 10 in Misty Island Rescue, but was replaced by Matt Wilkinson.

References

2011 British television seasons
Thomas & Friends seasons